Nanocorax is an extinct genus of mackerel sharks that lived during the Late Cretaceous. It contains two valid species, N. crassus and N. microserratodon. It has been found in North America, Europe, North Africa, and the Middle East.

References

Anacoracidae
Prehistoric shark genera